Khirbet Ibziq, Kh. Ibzîk, the ruin of Ibzîk, p.n.  is the name of a village with two ruins in the West Bank, separated by one kilometer and referred to in the Manasseh Hill Country Survey as Khirbet Ibziq (Lower, al-Tahta) and Khirbet Ibziq (Upper, al-Fauqa). They are about twenty kilometers northeast of Nablus. The "Lower" site is to the northeast of the "Upper" site.

History
Most scholars consider Khirbet Ibzik to have been the location of the biblical Bezek (also, Bezec) mentioned in 1 Samuel 11, although on the basis of archaeological evidence an alternate location for Bezek at Salhab has been proposed. Most scholars also think that the "Bezek" of 1 Samuel 11 is the same location as the "Bezek" of Judges 1, although others propose that the two refer to different locations.

The Lower site contains pottery from the Byzantine and Early Islamic Periods, and in the Byzantine period appears to have been coterminous with the Upper site. The Upper site, sometimes referred to simply as Khirbet Ibzik, contains a variety of pottery fragments extending from the Iron Age to the medieval period, including the Byzantine era.

In addition to the variation between Ibziq, Ibzik, and Ebziq the term Khirbet or khirbat is an Arabic term for a ruin, and is sometimes abbreviated "Kh.", spelled "hirbet" or "Khǔrbet," or left out altogether. The form Tell Ibziq also occurs.

Ottoman era
In 1882  the PEF's  Survey of Western Palestine  noted about Khǔrbet Ibzik that it was "evidently an ancient site, with traces of ruins, cisterns and caves, . . . There is a kubbeh in the ruins sacred to Sheikh Hazkin."

Israeli occupation
Since the Six-Day War in 1967, Khirbet Ibziq has been under Israeli occupation.

The village has 49 children of school age. The European Union provided the town with two prefabricated classrooms to cater to their needs from grades 1 to 6. The Israeli Defense Forces dismantled the structures down in October 2018 and it was announced in May of the following year that Israel intended to sell off the confiscated materials at auction in June 2019. The EU recognizes that the structures are illegal under Israeli law, but defends their infraction of that local legislation in terms of what is permissible in international law. The EU was also concerned that at auction the building materials would be bought by settlers. It also stated that the Israeli measure worked out as financial damage to donors amounting to 15,320 euros, and demanded either a restitution of the materials to the beneficiaries, or compensation. Israel offered to restore the materials before auction if the EU agreed not to erect them in violation of its laws again, a proposal rejected by the EU.

On  26 March 2020, Israel confiscated building materials from the village, part of which were meant for emergency housing and a clinic for the ongoing  coronavirus victims.

References

Bibliography

External links
Kh Ebziq (Fact Sheet),  Applied Research Institute–Jerusalem (ARIJ)
Ibziq Village Profile, ARIJ
Survey of Western Palestine, Map 12: IAA, Wikimedia commons

Archaeological sites in the West Bank